Time to value (TTV) is similar to return on investment (ROI), but instead of realizing the financial success of an investment, it implies achieving the effectiveness of an investment. This is applied mostly to added technology—data center hardware, network infrastructure, system security, etc. whereby the promised improvement becomes measurable. It can even be argued that in cases such as data security, TTV is more important than ROI since the security may only have financial benefits in banking and commercial industries, but has value—the protection of personal and/or corporate data—in every industry.

Purpose 

The time to value (TTV) measures the length of time necessary to finish a project and realize the benefits of the solution. The concept is used to help decision makers evaluate the proposed benefit of an investment in time and/or money.

Limitation
While the concept is easy to understand and explain to management or investors, the problem is that "completion", "benefit", and "value" are not as easy to define, can change over time, and the technology may even obsolesce before the installation is completed.

See also 
Return on investment

References 

Investment indicators